The Mayor of Islamabad is the mayor who heads Islamabad and the surrounding capital territory's municipal administration.

Local government system 
The office of the mayor was created pursuant to the Islamabad Capital Territory Local Government Act 2015, passed by the National Assembly and Senate in 2015. Islamabad has 50 Union Councils.

In addition to the mayor, three Deputy mayors are also elected to the office.

Administrative powers 
The mayor leads the Metropolitan Corporation Islamabad (MCI) whose executive branch consists of 77 elected officials; comprising 50 union council chairmen and 27 reserved seatholders. The IMC has 11,000 employees and its functions include urban planning, road maintenance, environment control, building control, water supply, sanitation, and other municipal services for the Islamabad Capital Territory. The mayor also chairs the Capital Development Authority (CDA) which has around 4,500 employees; its scope is mainly confined to estate management, sector developments and project executions.

List of mayors

Sheikh Anser Aziz was the first mayor of Islamabad. He took his oath on 4 March 2016. Following the announcement of an inquiry by the National Accountability Bureau for alleged corruption and misuse of authority, Aziz tendered his resignation.

The mayor's office is located in G-6, Islamabad.

Mayoral election history

Mayoral election 2015 

PML-(N) held a two-thirds majority in the Islamabad Metropolitan Corporation.

See also

 Mayor of Karachi
 Mayor of Rawalpindi
 Mayor of Lahore
 Mayor of Peshawar

References

 
Lists of mayors of places in Pakistan
Local government in Pakistan